Two Shoes is the second studio album by Australian ska-jazz band The Cat Empire, which was issued on 19 April 2005. It is the follow-up to their successful self-titled first album. It was recorded in November to December 2004 in Havana, Cuba. It débuted at the top of the ARIA Albums Chart and is the band's first number 1 album.

Background 

Australian ska-jazz group, The Cat Empire, released their second album, Two Shoes, on 19 April 2005. It was recorded in Havana, Cuba, at Egrem Studios, late in the previous year, with production by The Cat Empire, Felix Riebl (percussion and vocals) and United Kingdom-based producer, Jerry Boys. It débuted at the top of the ARIA Albums Chart and is the band's first number 1 album, the second being Rising with the Sun. The tracks were more Latin in flavour, with a higher proportion written by Harry James Angus (trumpet and vocals) than on their self-titled first album. The Australian version contains a hidden track, called "1001", which is coupled with the track, "The Night That Never End". Some later versions included songs that appeared on their debut album. The lead single, "Sly", was issued ahead of the album on 28 March, which reached the top 30. It appeared on EA Sports' FIFA 08 soundtrack. "The Car Song", written by Angus, was released as the second single in July, and peaked in the top 50.

Reception

Allmusic's Jeff Tamarkin wrote "Skipping merrily from alt-rock crunch to hip-hop beats, landing on reggae/ska, Latin jazz, and points in between, Two Shoes is clever and brainy, danceable and absorbing".

Track listing

Special Edition Bonus DVD
 Documentary - "Estudio 101: The Making of Two Shoes"
 Live at The Forum - "Lullaby" and "The Car Song"
 Music Videos - "Sly", "The Car Song" and "Two Shoes"
 The Making of "Two Shoes" Music Video.

Indica Records Bonus DVD
 Live at The Forum - "Lullaby" and "The Car Song"
 Woodford Folk Festival - "Sly" and "How to Explain?"
 From On the Attack - "The Lost Song", "The Rhythm", and DVD 'encore' videos - "Dancers" and "L'Hotel de Californie".
 Music videos - "Hello", "The Chariot", "The Car Song" and "Two Shoes".

Personnel 

The Cat Empire core members
 Harry James Angus – vocals, trumpet, recorder, resonator
 Will Hull-Brown – drums, shouts
 Jamshid Khadiwhala – turntables, tambourine, clave, shouts
 Ollie McGill – piano, keyboard, recorder, tubular bells, backing vocals
 Ryan Monro – double bass, bass guitar, backing vocals
 Felix Riebl – lead vocals, percussion

The Empire Horns (auxiliary members)
 Kieran Conrau – trombone (track 6)
 Ross Irwin – trumpet (track 6)

Additional musicians
 Jesus "Aguaje" Ramos – trombone (tracks 1-5, 7-8)
 Yauren Muniz – trumpet (tracks 1-5, 7)
 Javier R Zalba Suarez – baritone saxophone (tracks 1-4, 7)
 Georgina Cameron – violin (track 6)
 Alyssa Conrau – violin (track 6)
 Kristy Conrau – cello (track 6)
 Max Riebl – soprano vocals (track 6), solo trumpet (track 6)
 Jorge Yoandi Moline – congas (track 7)
 Arnado Valdes Perez – timbales (track 7)
 Maritza Montero – backing vocals (tracks 2, 6, 11)
 Idania Valdes – backing vocals (tracks 2, 6)
 Virgilio Valdes – backing vocals (track 6)

Recording details
 Produced by – Jerry Boys, Felix Riebl, The Cat Empire
 Recording – Jerry Boys, Adam Rhodes (strings and brass on Miserere, 1001 only)
 Editing – John Mallison, Donald Clarke
 Assistant engineering – John Mallison, Donald Clarke
 Studio assistant – Isel Martinez
 Mixing – Jerry Boys, Rafe McKenna, Adam Rhodes (Miserere, 1001 only)
 Assistant mixer – Luke Postil, Leigh C Williams
 Mastered by – Tom Leader

Charts

Certifications

References 

The Cat Empire albums
2005 albums
Indica Records albums